Thomas Greaves (12 April 1888 – 1960) was an English footballer who played for Stoke.

Career
Greaves was born in Hanley and played amateur football with Goldenhill Villa before joining Stoke in 1908. He played 13 times for Stoke scoring five goals and left for Hanley Swifts in 1911.

Career statistics

References

1888 births
1960 deaths
Sportspeople from Hanley, Staffordshire
English footballers
Association football forwards
Stoke City F.C. players
Merthyr Town F.C. players
Macclesfield Town F.C. players